Paxton Township may refer to:

 Paxton Township, Redwood County, Minnesota 
 Paxton Township, Ross County, Ohio
 Paxton Township, Ontario, see List of townships in Ontario#Nipissing District

See also 
 Lower Paxton Township, Dauphin County, Pennsylvania 
 Middle Paxton Township, Dauphin County, Pennsylvania 
 Upper Paxton Township, Dauphin County, Pennsylvania 
Paxton (disambiguation)

Township name disambiguation pages